Coim Beach (Praia de Coim) or Coin Rock Beach (Praia do Penedo de Coim) is a maritime beach of Póvoa de Varzim, Portugal in the civil parish of Aver-o-Mar, located between Esteiro Beach and Quião Beach.

Beaches of Póvoa de Varzim